The 2012 Season is Wuachon United's run season in the  Thai Premier League.

Players

Current squad
As of March 9, 2012

Competitions

Pre-season/friendly

Thai Premier League

League table

Match Stats

Top goalscorers
3 goal 
Aron da Silva
2 goal 
Jules Baga
Kirati Keawsombat
1 goal 
Antonie Clement Bayema
Arthit Sunthornpit
Sarawut Janthapan
Weerayut Jitkuntod

References

External links
 Football Association of Thailand

Wuachon United